Ghost Story or Ghost Stories may refer to:
 Ghost story, a story or tale involving ghosts

Film
 Spellbound (1941 film) or Ghost Story, a film by John Harlow
 Ghost Story (1974 film), a film featuring Marianne Faithfull
 Ghost Story (1981 film), an adaptation of the Peter Straub novel
 Patrick Macnee's Ghost Stories, a 1997 series of direct-to-video programs
 Ghost Stories (2017 film), a film by Andy Nyman and Jeremy Dyson
 A Ghost Story, a 2017 American drama film by David Lowery
 Ghost Stories (2020 film), a Hindi anthology film

Literature
 Ghost Story (Straub novel), a 1979 horror novel by Peter Straub
 Ghost Story (Butcher novel), a 2011 novel in the Dresden Files series by Jim Butcher
 Ghost Stories (magazine), a Macfadden Publications magazine from 1926 to 1932

Television 
 Ghost Story (TV series) or Circle of Fear, a 1972 supernatural anthology series
 Ghost Stories (Japanese TV series) or Gakkou no Kaidan, a 2000 anime series
 Ghost Stories (1997 TV series), an American horror anthology series
 Ghost Stories (2009 TV series), an American documentary series
 "Ghost Story" (Lego Ninjago: Masters of Spinjitzu), a 2015 episode of Lego Ninjago: Masters of Spinjitzu
 "Ghost Story" (Rugrats), a 1999 episode of Rugrats
"Ghost Stories", an episode of Cloak & Dagger
 "Ghost Stories" (Scream Queens), an episode of the series Scream Queens

Music
 Ghost Story (album), a 2004 album by Phideaux Xavier
 "Ghost Story" (song), a 2022 song by Carrie Underwood
 Ghost Stories (Coldplay album) (2014)
 "Ghost Story", a bonus track from this album
 Ghost Stories (Dream Syndicate album) (1988)
 Ghost Stories (Amanda Ghost album) (2000)
 Ghost Stories (Chantal Kreviazuk album) (2006)
 Ghost Stories (The Lawrence Arms album) (2000)
 Ghost Stories (Silent Civilian album) (2010)
 "Ghost Story", a 1970 song by John Cale from Vintage Violence

Other uses
 Ghost Stories (play), a 2010 play by Jeremy Dyson and Andy Nyman
 Ghost Story Games, formerly named Irrational Games, a video game development studio

See also
 List of ghost films
 My Ghost Story, 2010 documentary television series